Michael or Mike Sheehan may refer to:

Michael Sheehan (coadjutor archbishop of Sydney) (1870–1945), Gaelic author aka Michéal Ó Síothcháin
Michael Sheehan (archbishop of Santa Fe) (born 1939), retired American Roman Catholic prelate
Michael Sheehan (politician), Irish independent politician
Michael A. Sheehan (1955–2018), Ambassador at Large for Counter-terrorism and Deputy Commissioner for Terrorism, NYPD
Michael Sheehan (actor), American voice actor, in animations, e.g. Fred and Barney Meet the Thing, The Flintstone Comedy Show and Spider-Man
Michael Sheehan (hurler), Irish hurler, see Cork Minor Hurling Team 1988